Heijo Muteki Ryu (Heijō Muteki Ryū), a Japanese school of swordsmanship (kenjutsu/kendo), founded by Yamanouchi Renshinsai. In c 1668, Yamanouchi Renshinsai described his swordsmanship as kendo.

See also
Abe ryū
Kenjutsu
Kendo

References

Japanese swordsmanship
Ko-ryū bujutsu
Japanese martial arts